The women's discus throw event at the 2007 Summer Universiade was held on 12 August.

Results

References
Results
Final results

Discus
2007 in women's athletics
2007